Kees Weijer is a professor of Developmental Physiology and the Head of Systems Biology at the School of Life Sciences, University of Dundee.

Education 
Weijer acquired all his degrees from Utrecht University (Netherlands): from 1970 to 1985 a Bachelor of Science (Bsc), a Master of Science (Msc), and a PhD in Biology. In 1991, Weijer received his ‘’Habilitation’’.

Career 
Weijer worked as an assistant in the Zoological Institute of the Ludwig Maximilian University of Munich in Germany during 1982 and 1996.  During this time, he was promoted from assistant to lecturer, then to a senior lecturer. He has worked at the University of Dundee since 1996 and was initially appointed as senior lecturer in the previous Department of Anatomy and Physiology. In 2008, he was promoted to a principal lecturer.

Research 
Weijer’s main research is focused on understanding cell-to-cell signalling and its relationship with cell behaviour (i.e. differentiation, division, shape change and movement). Most of his research that is based around cell movement is conducted using the model organisms of the chick embryo and the amoeba Dictyostelium discoideum.
 
He has helped to develop an enhanced microscopy technique to make it possible to visualise individual cells of the primitive streak in embryonic development. He was also one of the developers of the Active Vertex Model (AVM), a computerised model to visualize how collective behaviour emerges in tissue cells.

Honours 
Wolfson Research Medal, the Royal Society, 2002 
Elected Fellow, Royal Society of Edinburgh, 2004

References 

Academics of the University of Dundee
Year of birth missing (living people)
Living people